USS Tingey may refer to:

United States Navy ship names